Sattari is an administrative division of Goa, India.

Sattari or Satari may also refer to:

Places
Sattari, Malda, a village in West Bengal, India
Sattari High School
Satari, a peak in the Potosí mountain range, Bolivia

Other uses
Satari, character in List of The Bionic Woman episodes
Satari on List of roof shapes
Satari, a crown, see Lakshmi Kumara Thathachariar

People with the surname Sattari
Jalal Sattari (1931–2021), Iranologist, mythologist, writer, and translator
Mansour Sattari (1945–1995), Commander of the Iranian Air Force
Mohammad Sattari (b. 1993), footballer
Sorena Sattari (b. 1972), scientist, inventor, and a vice president of Iran